A Slightly Pregnant Man is a 1973 comedy film written and directed by Jacques Demy.

Plot
Marco is a driving instructor who is engaged to single mother Irène, a hairdresser. After eating a chicken dinner, he complains to his housekeeper that she cooks chicken too frequently. He begins to feel bloated and tired and sees a doctor. The doctor determines that he is pregnant, and an expert concludes that the hormones in chicken have made him sufficiently feminine to carry a child. With his permission, the doctors publicize this event, and he becomes a model for a maternity clothing company creating a new line of paternity clothes. The majority of the film covers Marco revealing his pregnancy to his friends and family including his ex-wife and their reactions prior to going public with it.

The movie has two different endings. In the original French version, Marco is diagnosed with having hysterical pregnancy; saddening both him and Irène. As they finally get married Irène begins to feel sick and reveals to Marco that she is pregnant. In the Italian ending, Marco realizes that he was misdiagnosed and suddenly goes into labor at his wedding, though the baby is not shown. Afterwards, men everywhere suddenly begin having pregnancy symptoms.

Cast
 Catherine Deneuve as Irène de Fontenoy
 Marcello Mastroianni as Marco Mazetti
 Micheline Presle as Dr. Delavigne
 Marisa Pavan as Maria Mazetti
 Claude Melki as Lucien Soumain
 André Falcon as Scipion Lemeu
 Maurice Biraud as Lamarie
 Alice Sapritch as Ramona Martinez
 Raymond Gérôme as Gérard Chaumont de Latour
 Michèle Moretti as Ginou
 Madeleine Barbulée as Mlle Janvier
 Micheline Dax as Mme Corfa
 Benjamin Legrand as Lucas
 Jacques Legras as Leboeuf
 Myriam Boyer as Ninon Barbeau
 Andrée Tainsy as Clarisse de Saint-Clair
 Mireille Mathieu as herself
 Tonie Marshall as Bobino host

References

External links
 
 
 

1973 films
1973 comedy films
1970s French films
1970s French-language films
1970s Italian films
1970s pregnancy films
Films directed by Jacques Demy
Films scored by Michel Legrand
Films set in Paris
French comedy films
French pregnancy films
French-language Italian films
Italian comedy films
Italian pregnancy films